Rock of the Dead is a music video game. It was developed by Epicenter Studios and distributed by Conspiracy Entertainment and UFO Interactive Games. The game was released in 2010 for iOS, PlayStation 3, and Xbox 360.

Gameplay
Players use a guitar or drum peripheral to control the game. Two players can play what is called a "competitive co-op" throughout the game.

Plot
Players will take on the role of the main character (voiced by Neil Patrick Harris) who has the ability to defeat enemies (often zombies) with the power of rock as he searches for his love interest (voiced by Felicia Day). Players have a few weapons at their disposal (including a shield and blast power-up), but the player can only use these by strumming the correct colored fret buttons in order on their guitar controller. The developers have bands record rock versions of classical music.

Development
Epicenter described the game, saying, "Picture Typing of the Dead but with Guitar Hero guitars."

While originally announced as a Wii exclusive title, the title would ultimately release on PlayStation 3, Xbox 360 and iOS. While Epicenter claimed that a planned Wii version was not cancelled and simply on the back burner, the game never saw a release on the Wii console.

Reception

The game received "generally unfavorable reviews" on both platforms according to the review aggregation website Metacritic.

References

External links
 Rock of the Dead Official Website
 

2010 video games
Cancelled Wii games
IOS games
Music video games
North America-exclusive video games
PlayStation 3 games
Video games developed in the United States
Xbox 360 games
Video games about zombies
Drumming video games
Guitar video games
Conspiracy Entertainment games
UFO Interactive Games games